A Space Operations Center (SOC) is a facility such as a Mission Control Center for controlling spaceflight and/or spacelift missions, and may refer to:

    614th Air and Space Operations Center, a U.S. Space Force operations center at Vandenberg AFB, California
    Air Force Satellite Control Facility, a former USAF structure with various SOCs (e.g. for the Corona satellite, GPS, etc.) at Onizuka AFS, California
    Combined Space Operations Center, a U.S. Space Command operations center at Vandenberg AFB
    European Space Operations Centre, a European Space Agency facility at Darmstadt, Germany
    Space Flight Operations Facility, a Jet Propulsion Laboratory facility in Pasadena, California
    Consolidated Space Operations Center, the development name for Falcon Air Force Station (now Schriever Air Force Base)
    Marshall Space Flight Center, a NASA facility at Huntsville, Alabama